The Warlord: Battle for the Galaxy (also known as The Osiris Chronicles) is a science fiction film which aired on January 27, 1998 on television. The film is written by screenwriter Caleb Carr, who wrote the novel The Alienist, and directed by Joe Dante. It was intended to be the pilot for a series called The Osiris Chronicles that never materialized. Similar concepts would later be used in Andromeda.

Synopsis

The story takes place several centuries in the future. Mankind has colonized the entire Solar System and beyond, and hardships such as war, disease, hunger, and overpopulation have been eliminated. However, boredom spread rapidly throughout the galaxy and as a result, interstellar war broke out. The two opposing factions  were the Galactic Republic and the Rebels. While the Rebels eventually defeated the Galactic Republic because of their far greater numbers, the former were no better off; the aftermath of that war was a new Dark Age. Houses, plantations, and, more importantly, most books were destroyed in the war, and knowledge of interstellar travel was mostly lost, available only to a privileged few. Mankind, in the film, had made much progress, only to be rewarded with "third world" living conditions, despite people still possessing very advanced computers.

Plot

The movie opens in the living room of a very luxurious house. A man named Heenoc Xian (John Pyper-Ferguson), is reading his book when his concentration suddenly drifts away and he reminisces about his life in chronological order, from being a pilot during his Academy years, to a freedom fighter, and to eventually, a warlord. He recalls the latter with irony as he narrates the tale of those particular events of his life. It begins on the planet Caliban 5, ruled by none other than Warlord Heenoc Xian. A young man named Justin Thorpe (John Corbett), a petty thief who carves out a living for himself by trading items he obtained through stealing and salvaging, comes home one night to his battered, run-down house as he is greeted by his kid sister, Nova (J. Madison Wright), a precocious pre-teen. Their parents are revealed to be dead, and they are all that remains of their family. Their lives have a routine and their evenings usually end with Nova teaching Thorpe to read a chapter of a book each night. The two siblings have learnt to make the most of the situation and are content. However, one day, Thorpe returns from his morning routine and discovers that Nova has disappeared. Knowing his sister would never run away from home, Thorpe comes to the conclusion that she had been kidnapped, but does not know who the kidnapper is and why she was taken.

Frantic and desperate, Thorpe turns to Warlord Xian for help. Despite his ominous title, Xian is not entirely a warmonger, considering his heroic past; he listens to his people and is sympathetic towards them, and has provided a reasonable amount of order and security in a chaotic world, despite the fact that some of the people under his rule have expressed a degree of ungratefulness and resentment towards him. He listens to Thorpe's grievance, and while he feels for him, he cannot help him because he does not have enough possessions to trade for Xian's services. With that, Thorpe leaves in anger but is suddenly met by Nova's best friend Maggi Sorenson (Elisabeth Harnois), a cute and cynical teenager who happens to be the granddaughter of General Lars Sorenson (played by veteran Australian actor Rod Taylor), a man who was a former soldier of the now extinct Galactic Republic. Maggi introduces her grandfather to Thorpe. Sorenson knows what Thorpe wants and offers to help him by searching for Nova using his starship, the Osiris. However, he informs Thorpe that he must help him first by applying his thieving skills to steal precious jewels from the Warlord Xian's treasure chest, so that he can pay someone to fix his ship. Thorpe and Maggi are nearly caught by the Warlord's henchmen, but they subdue them and eventually succeed in obtaining the goods from the treasure chest.

Before long, Thorpe, Sorenson, and Maggi arrive on a shuttlecraft to the Osiris, a sleek ship that resembles a shark, parked out in deep space. Once inside the ship, they bump into Thorpe's long-time friend, Wally Price (Darryl Theirse), a man who has "really strong feelings" but is not actually a telepath or a psychic. Sorenson is greatly puzzled about how he managed to get inside the Osiris, since the ship is genetically keyed. Wally convinces the gang that his extraordinary intuition will aid in Thorpe's search for Nova. All that remains now is for the ship to be repaired. Sorenson hires cloaked humanoid aliens, a race known only as "The Engineers" to repair the ship's engine. These beings have no interest in communicating with other lifeforms; the only thing they care for is technology. As soon as the ship is fixed, The Engineers leave.

Later, Sorenson informs Thorpe that he has a vague idea of where Nova is being held captive. However, Sorenson has his own agenda for helping Thorpe: he wants to rebuild the old Republic and to do that he needs to find Trajan Cabel, the grandson of the last Proconsul, Julius Cabel. For this purpose he hires an Arbitrator, a diplomatic mercenary, who, to his surprise, turns out to be Rula Kor (Carolyn McCormick), Sorenson's daughter! She brings along her mute and beautiful bodyguard Jana (Marjorie Monaghan) for protection, should the need arise. Their surprise is magnified when she tells the men that The Engineers are the ones who are holding Nova prisoner. Sorenson then confesses to Thorpe that he knew all along that The Engineers were the ones who kidnapped Nova, but he did not want Thorpe to know beforehand because The Engineers were the only ones who knew how to fix the ship. Had he told Thorpe beforehand, the ship would have remained dead in space and they would have no way of rescuing Nova. Initially, Thorpe is peeved at Sorenson for misleading him, but Wally informs him that in spite of Sorenson's questionable agenda, he senses that his heart is in the right place. As a result, Thorpe and Sorenson make a pact to be upfront with each other from then on, and set a course to rescue Nova, based on Rula's reliable sources.

Meanwhile, the Warlord is hell-bent on capturing Thorpe for stealing from him, and is hot on his trail in his battleship, the Daedalus. He chases Thorpe and his crew through a volcanic planet and fires on his ship with vengeance, but the Osiris escapes and finds itself face-to-face with a cloaked planet in deep space, the homeworld of The Engineers. They allow the crew of the Osiris to come down to their planet using the Osiris's teleportation system, known as a multi-spatial transverse system which works by folding space (a variation of a wormhole), after which they explain why they kidnapped Nova: she is a supergenius and they need her vast intellect for their Sublime Plenum, a huge amalgamation of their greatest ancestors’ minds and souls, which turns out to be a grotesque exhibit of goo filled with countless bodies mixed together with tentacles, its aim: to eliminate all emotion and the concept of family. The crew of the Osiris does not stand for this, especially Thorpe. Rula makes The Engineers an offer in exchange for Nova's life, but they refuse. With that, Thorpe snatches Nova from the clutches of The Engineers, only managing to convince her to leave by stressing the need for family and love. The crew make it back to the Osiris, but Nova is grabbed away at the last minute while the Osiris faces another attack by the Daedalus. However, Sorenson offers Xian a truce and allows him to come on board the Osiris to explain the current crisis. When Xian learns of The Engineers’ plan, he offers his services. With Xian's help, they destroy the Sublime Plenum, leaving The Engineers in defeat and rescue Nova again, this time with success. 
 
During all this, Sorenson discovers that Xian is the man he has been looking for all along: he is Trajan Cabel, the man who is destined to help rebuild the old Galactic Republic. However, Xian is not thrilled about the idea; he was greatly opposed to the formation of a new Republic, which is why he left his former life, changed his name to Heenoc Xian, and became a warlord. In spite of this, Xian decides to help Thorpe rebuild the Galactic Republic with new ideals and values. Sorenson steps down as General and gives Thorpe the Osiris for him to command with Nova at his side, Maggi as his pilot/navigator, Wally as the computer expert, Rula as an arbitrator, and Jana as chief of security. As for Xian, he remains on the Daedalus but provides his expertise in strategy and war tactics to Thorpe, acting as his counsel. With the Osiris and Daedalus as the only relics of the Old Galaxy Republic, it is a new beginning for humanity's reemergence to the stars.

Cast

Stars 
 John Corbett - Justin Thorpe
 Carolyn McCormick - Rula Kor 
 John Pyper-Ferguson - Heenoc Xian
 Elisabeth Harnois - Maggi Sorenson
 J. Madison Wright - Nova
 Darryl Theirse - Wally Price
 Marjorie Monaghan - Jana
 Joel Swetow - Shahklan
 Philip Moon - Valois
 Rod Taylor - General Sorenson

Co-stars 
 Lilyan Chauvin - Mashwah
 Rhino Michaels - Barka
 Dick Miller - Peddler
 Rob Elk - Guard
 Dyrk Ashton - Thief #1
 John Marlo - Second Thief
 Dorothy A. Gallagher - Assaulted Woman
 Michael Quill - Doctor
 Shannon Welch - Young Girl
 Dawn Ann Billings - Gita
 Leslie Redden - Magda
 Tom Billet - Thief #3
 Steven E. Daniels - Thief #4
 Belinda Balaski - Barterer's Wife
 Gregory Kargianis - Young Boy

Production
Rod Taylor played a role originally meant for Christopher Lee. The budget was $10 million.

References

External links
 

1998 television films
1998 films
1990s science fiction films
American space adventure films
American science fiction television films
Films directed by Joe Dante
Television films as pilots
Television pilots not picked up as a series
1990s American films
UPN original films